Dev Gore (born 31 July 1997 in Oklahoma City, Oklahoma) is an American professional racing driver competing in international motorsport.

Background
Gore started his racing career at the age of 18 years old. After an initial taste of karting in 2015, he entered the Florida Winter Tour and the Rotax Grand Nationals in the DD2 category. In 2016, he moved into US DD2 National and US Open DD2 and was crowned champion. Gore raced for Team USA at the Rotax Grand Finals.

He is a graduate of Bertil Roos Racing School.

In 2021 he will compete in the DTM for the Rosberg team. He calls his car "Toothless" based on one of the two main characters from the film trilogy How to Train Your Dragon.

Career
Gore was a participant in the MAXSpeed Driver Advancement Program in 2017 and made his debut in the Cooper Tires USF2000 Championship, part of the Mazda Road to Indy development program.

Gore finished the 2017 Cooper Tires USF2000 in 13th place in the overall standings, among a total of 36 drivers. Instead of repeating the same category for another year, he shifted his focus to European motorsport for 2018 and drives for Carlin in the Euroformula Open series.

In early 2019, he raced as part of the Castrol Toyota Racing Series. In April 2019, it was announced that Gore would race with Strakka Racing in the Blancpain GT Endurance Cup.

Racing record

Career summary

American open–wheel racing results

U.S. F2000 National Championship

Complete Euroformula Open Championship results 
(key) (Races in bold indicate pole position; races in italics indicate points for the fastest lap of top ten finishers)

Complete Toyota Racing Series results 
(key) (Races in bold indicate pole position) (Races in italics indicate fastest lap)

Complete Deutsche Tourenwagen Masters results 
(key) (Races in bold indicate pole position) (Races in italics indicate fastest lap)

References

External links
 Official site

American racing drivers
Living people
1997 births
Deutsche Tourenwagen Masters drivers
Carlin racing drivers
U.S. F2000 National Championship drivers
Toyota Racing Series drivers
Blancpain Endurance Series drivers
Euroformula Open Championship drivers
Strakka Racing drivers
Team Rosberg drivers
Racing drivers from Oklahoma
Racing drivers from Oklahoma City
Sportspeople from Oklahoma City